This article lists the heads of state of South Sudan since the establishment of the Southern Sudan Autonomous Region within Sudan in 1972.

The president of the Republic of South Sudan is the head of state and head of government of South Sudan. The president leads the executive branch of the Government of South Sudan and is the commander-in-chief of the South Sudan People's Defence Forces. The official residence of the president is State House, J1.

History of the office
The region of Southern Sudan (currently the independent republic of South Sudan) became autonomous for the first time, within Sudan, in 1972, through the Addis Ababa Agreement meant to end the First Sudanese Civil War, and its local government had five presidents until 1983, when the Sudanese central government revoked the autonomy. Autonomy was gained again in 2005, through the Comprehensive Peace Agreement meant to end the Second Sudanese Civil War, and the position of president of Southern Sudan was restored. Then, on 9 July 2011, South Sudan became independent and a new constitution was adopted.

Titles of heads of state
 1972–1983: President of the High Executive Council
 2005–2011: President of the Government
 2011–present: President

Heads of state of South Sudan (1972–present)

(Dates in italics indicate de facto continuation of office)

Note: The President of South Sudan was also First Vice President of the Sudanese national government until 9 July 2011.

Timeline

Incoming election

See also
 Southern Sudan Autonomous Region (1972–1983)
 Southern Sudan Autonomous Region (2005–2011)
 Politics of South Sudan
 List of governors of pre-independence Sudan
 Vice President of South Sudan
 List of current heads of state and government

Notes

References

External links
 World Statesmen – South Sudan

Government of South Sudan
History of South Sudan
South Sudan
 
Heads of state
Heads of state